Dolichandrone atrovirens, also known as wavy trumpet flower, is a deciduous tree in the family Bignoniaceae. It is endemic to the Indian subcontinent.

Description
The tree attains a height of 16 m. Leaves are pinnate compound 10 cm long on a 5 cm long stalk. Flowering occurs in April–June. Flowers are trumpet-shaped and white. The fruit capsule is up to 30 cm long.

References

External links

 GBIF - Dolichandrone atrovirens (Roth) K.S…

Endemic flora of India (region)
atrovirens